Sir Robert Abercromby, 5th Baronet of Birkenbog and Forglen, FRSE KGCB DL (4 February 1784 – 6 July 1855) was a Scottish politician.

Life

He was the son of Sir George Abercromby, 4th Baronet, and Jane Ogilvie, the daughter of Alexander Ogilvie, 7th Lord Banff. He succeeded to the titles on the death of his father in 1831. Among the properties he inherited were the main family seat, which was Forglen House in Turriff, Aberdeenshire. He commissioned the Aberdeen City Architect, John Smith to design a new mansion in 1839.

From 1812 to 1818 he was the Member of Parliament for Banffshire.
During the first quarter of the 19th century, Abercromby purchased most of the town and lands of Fermoy in Ireland from fellow Scotsman John Anderson. His grandson, Sir Robert John Abercromby, 7th Baronet is recorded as the owner of 434 acres of land in County Cork during the 1870s.

In 1822 he was elected a Fellow of the Royal Society of Edinburgh his proposer being David Brewster.

In 1839 he commissioned Aberdeen architect John Smith to totally remodel Forglen House.

His town residence was at 18 Coates Crescent in Edinburgh's West End.

He died at Forglen on 6 July 1855.

Family

On 22 October 1816 he married Elizabeth Stephenson Douglas (1795-1863), only daughter of Samuel Douglas of Netherlaw, Kirkcudbrightshire. They had 15 children of which the first 7 were daughters. The eighth child, George Samuel Abercromby (22 May 1824 – 14 November 1872) became 6th baronet on his father's death.

In 1839, a daughter, Georgina Charlotte, died aged only 16 (she is buried in St Johns churchyard in Edinburgh).

In 1852, a daughter, Roberta Henrietta Abercromby, married Sir Edwin Hare Dashwood, 7th Baronet.

In 1862, a daughter, Frances Emily Abercromby, married William Forbes-Sempill, 17th Lord Sempill.

Artistic Recognition

He was portrayed by Sir Henry Raeburn.

See also

 Abercromby baronets

References
Citations

Bibliography

External links

1784 births
1855 deaths
Baronets in the Baronetage of Nova Scotia
Members of the Parliament of the United Kingdom for Scottish constituencies
UK MPs 1812–1818
Fellows of the Royal Society of Edinburgh
Robert